Gunasundari Katha is a 1949 Indian Telugu language fantasy film produced and directed by K. V. Reddy, starring Sriranjani, Kasturi Siva Rao, Santha Kumari. The script was written by Pingali Nagendra Rao, K. V. Reddy, and Kamalakara Kameswara Rao. Kameswara Rao was also the associate director. William Shakespeare's play King Lear was the inspiration for the core plot. But the writers changed the tone from the tragedy of King Lear to a more entertaining one for the film. The film was commercially successful.

Plot 
King Ugrasena (Govindarajula Subba Rao) of Dhara Nagaram had three daughters: Rupasundari (Santakumari) who is married to her cousin Haramati (Subba Rao), Hemasundari (Malathi) who is married to her cousin Kalamata (Relangi), and Gunasundari (Sriranjani).

During a discussion, the King asked his daughters who they loved the most. Rupa and Hema told him they loved him the most, even more than their husbands. Gunasundari who is unmarried insists that she will love her husband the most once she is married. She goes on to say that she will love him more than her father regardless of his appearance or physical condition.

Her father the King was offended by this and forced Gunasundari to marry a hideous and disabled man, Daivadheenam (Kasturi Siva Rao). After the arranged marriage to the ugliest man in the country, the king exiles his daughter to live outside the palace with her new husband whom she now loves more than the King.

Eventually, the King is wounded and develops a chronic illness. The Physicians tell him the wound could only be cured with the diamond "Mahendra Mani". The King sends his three sons-in-law on a journey to find the diamond.

Daivadheenam overcomes his disabilities during the quest for "Mahendra Mani". No one knew that Daivadheenam was once a handsome prince who had been cursed by his guru for misconduct and character flaws. While fulfilling the quest of finding the diamond and overcoming his physical limitations Daivadheenam's character was fixed. He then brings the diamond to the palace and cures the king. This breaks Daivadheenam's curse and he is returned to his original form.

Cast

Songs 
The Music is composed by Ogirala Ramachandra Rao. There are many lyrics, all of them written by Pingali Nagendra Rao. "Sri Tulasi Jaya Tulasi", sung by P. Leela, was a hit with the public.
 "Adiye Eduraivachche Daka Pada Munduku Padipodam" (Singers: Relangi and Pamarti Krishna Murthy)
 "Amma Mahalakshmi Dayacheyavamma" (Singer: Ghantasala)
 "Challani Doravele O Chandamama" (Singers: Malathi and Shanta Kumari)
 "Kala Kala Aa Kokilemo Palukarinche Vintiva" (Singers: Malathi and Shanta Kumari)
 "Kalpagama Tallivai Ghanata Velasina Gouri" (Singer: P. Leela)
 "O Chaaru Sheela Le Javarala" (Singer: V. Shivaram)
 "O Matha Raavaa Naa Mora Vinavaa" (Singer: P. Leela)
 "Ore Ore Brahma Devuda" (Singer: Kasturi Shiva Rao)
 "Siri Thalam Vesenante" (Singers: Kasturi Shiva Rao and P. Leela)
 "Sri Thulasi Jaya Thulasi Jayamuneeyave" (Singer: P. Leela)
 "Thelusukondayya" (Singers: T. G. Kamala Devi and Chorus)
 "Upakaara Gunaalayavai Vunnavu Kade Maatha" (Singer: P. Leela)

References

External links 
 Gunasundari Katha at IMDb.

1940s Telugu-language films
1949 films
Films based on King Lear
Films directed by K. V. Reddy
Indian films based on plays
Films scored by Ogirala Ramachandra Rao
Indian black-and-white films
Indian fantasy films
1940s fantasy films